An agogô (Yoruba: agogo, meaning bell) is a single or a multiple
bell now used throughout the world but with origins in traditional Yoruba and Edo music and also in the samba baterias (percussion ensembles). The agogô may be the oldest samba instrument and was based on West African Yoruba single or double bells. The agogô has the highest pitch of any of the bateria instruments.

Construction
Each bell is a different size. This allows a differently pitched note to be produced depending on which bell has been hit. Originally wrought iron, they are now manufactured in a variety of metals and sizes for different sound qualities. The most common arrangement is two bells attached by a U shaped piece of metal. The smaller bell is held uppermost. Either bell may be hit with a wooden stick to make a cowbell like sound or less commonly a clicking sound is produced by squeezing the two bells together.

Origins/History/Evolution

The Yoruba, Igala, and Edo peoples of Nigeria use the word "agogô," which refers to a single or double clapperless bell. (Page 33 of Gourley et al. The name agogô and the idea of an instrumental were carried to the Americas by African slaves, where they were revived and used in both form and function over time as circumstances allowed and customs changed.

Dimensions

10 in. length

5.6 in. length (larger bell)

2.7 in. diameter of rim (larger bell)

4.6 in. length (smaller bell)

2 in. diameter of rim (smaller bell)

Religious origins
It is used in the ceremonial music of religions in Yorubaland as well as in their new world practice, which is based on beliefs such as Candomblé brought by slaves from Africa.

USES

Bells are primarily used as percussion instruments in traditional Yoruba music. It is yet another crucial musical instrument in their music, along with the sekere and gangan (talking drum). This bell is used by their cultural groups; in fact, traditional dancers can only move to the sounds made by the bell. Additionally, it plays a significant role in the Yoruba musical subgenres of Juju, Afro-juju, Apala, Fuji, and others. Agogo is always present in the musical instruments used by the performers that introduced Nigerian music to a global audience. The main musical instrument used in the dancing masquerades is also the bell. In addition to smaller bells fastened to their ankles, masqueraders exhibit musical skill at cultural events.

Additionally, this ringing bell is crucial to the king-making and chieftaincy rites. It plays a significant role in various regions' specific ceremonies performed throughout these procedures. The Chief Priest's or occultists' declarations or prayers must be accompanied by the ringing of the bell. One of the finest Yoruba epic films, Saworo Ide & Agogo Ewo, depicts this. These films, created by director Tunde Kelani, provide more insight into the significance of the bell in Yoruba culture.

The bell was utilized in Yoruba land and certain other regions of Nigeria before the development of social media, telecommunication, and radio stations to communicate information to the populace. Using the bell to draw attention, the town crier informs the populace of information from the monarch or leaders. As soon as the bell is rung using a wooden stick, everyone congregates in one spot to hear what the town crier has to say. The bell, which may be compared to the current tweet that is sent out to the entire world, is just as significant in this situation as the town crier.

A bell known as agogo is used for religious reasons in addition to the percussion bell. It features a tongue and a clapper that are used to generate noise by striking the metallic body. Pentecostal congregations utilize it as a type of musical instrument and for prayer. The importance of agogo is the same everywhere in the world.

Rhythmic patterns

Bell pattern 1 is the most basic, or archetypal pattern. It is the 4/4 form of what is known in ethnomusicology as the standard pattern, and known in Cuba as  clave. Pattern 1 is used in maculelê and some Candomblé and Macumba rhythms.  Bell 2 is used in afoxê and can be thought of as pattern 1 embellished with four additional strokes. Bell 3 is used in batucada. Pattern 4 is the maracatu bell and can be thought of as pattern 1 embellished with four additional strokes.

In rock music

 Copacabana, popular American disco song by Barry Manilow featuring an agogo bell solo in the introduction
 Love Rollercoaster, popular American funk song by Ohio Players featuring a prominent agogo bell 
 Soulfly frontman Max Cavalera played a pair of agogô on the band's debut album.

See also 
 Cowbell (instrument)
 Claves

References

African and African-American Contributions to World Music (PDF)

External links

Bateria Sounds

African percussion instruments
Bells (percussion)
Brazilian percussion
Capoeira
Central American and Caribbean percussion instruments
Hand percussion
Idiophones struck directly
Metal percussion instruments
Samba
Unpitched percussion instruments
Yoruba musical instruments